Zhura is a free, web-based screenwriting software application for writing and formatting screenplays to the film industry standard, as well as other formats. Zhura allows users to collaborate on scripts in public or private groups and uses Creative Commons Licensing for all work in the public workspace.

On March 29, 2010, Zhura announced its merger with Scripped. Scripped's CEO, Sunil Rajaraman, remains the company's Chief Executive Officer as of 2022. The Zhura CEO was Eric MacDonald, a former Cascade Communications engineer. Scripped later closed on April 1, 2015 after a catastrophic, irrecoverable data loss.

Script editor
Screenplay Template – The script editor provides a built-in screenplay template which formats the document to a standard for scripts as recommended by the AMPAS. The screenplay document is composed of seven elements: scene, action, character, dialogue, parenthetical, transition and shot (see image). Each element has a specific style to which the script editor conforms as you type.
Script Formats – Other major script formats for stage play, sitcom, audio drama and comic book are also supported as well as the ability to switch between them.
Auto-Complete – Characters, scene headings and custom transitions are “remembered” as they are written and “recalled” with tab-completion when a writer starts a new character, scene heading or transition, respectively.
Multiple Editors – With a collaborative editing model comparable to Google Docs, two or more users can edit the same script simultaneously, regardless of having a different operating system or web browser.  
Import/Export – A screenplay written in another program can be imported into the script editor and automatically conformed to the screenplay template.   The closer the original script has adhered to the standard format, the better it will appear when imported. Supported import/export formats include Text (.txt) Word (.doc) Rich Text (.rtf) and OpenDocument (.odt). Scripts can also be exported as a PDF file with additional options.
Tracking Changes – Similar to the “tracking” feature in Microsoft Word, a user can review all changes made to a script in the revision history as well as highlight the contributions of each writer.
 Offline Mode  The Google Gears-based offline functionality is in the process of being updated and is not available for new subscribers, according to the company founders.

Community
Scripped supports typical social networking features such as discussion boards, comments, user profiles, public and private writing groups, internal webmail and instant messaging within the script editor. There is also the option to share scripts with others outside of Scripped by making scripts externally viewable. Scripped is made up entirely of user-generated scripts that other users can share, critique and edit, offering creative support to a community of writers.

Licensing of user-created work
There are three types of workspaces on Scripped (personal, group and public) with unique copyright and licensing management for the work created in each area. Any work a user originates may be moved from the personal area to a public or group area at any time. Once another user edits a script, however, it cannot be moved into the originator’s personal area.

Personal Workspace – Any script created or video uploaded in the user’s personal workspace remains copyrighted to that user. Until the user moves that script or video from their personal area into a group or public area, no other user shares a copyright or license to that work.

Private Group Workspace – The copyright to any script created or video uploaded in a private group workspace is allocated by the individual members of the group, however they see fit.

Public Workspace – Any script created or video uploaded in the public workspace is assigned a Creative Commons license by the originator of that work.  The originator of a script may select one of four Creative Commons licenses before introducing that script to the public. The selection of the license is determined by what the author wants to allow others to do with the work. Below is a list of Creative Commons licenses available for all scripts and videos in the public workspace.

 Share Alike (BY-SA)
This license lets others remix, tweak, and build upon your work even for commercial reasons, as long as they credit you and license their new creations under the identical terms. This license is often compared to open source software licenses. All new works based on yours will carry the same license, so any derivatives will also allow commercial use.

 No Derivatives (BY-ND)
This license allows for redistribution, commercial and non-commercial, as long as it is passed along unchanged and in whole, with credit to you.

 Non-Commercial, No Derivatives (BY-NC-ND)
This license is the most restrictive of the four licenses, allowing redistribution. This license is often called the "free advertising" license because it allows others to download your works and share them with others as long as they mention you and link back to you, but they can't change them in any way or use them commercially.

 Non-Commercial, Share Alike (BY-NC-SA) 
This license lets others remix, tweak, and build upon your work non-commercially, as long as they credit you and license their new creations under the identical terms. Others can download and redistribute your work just like the BY-NC-ND license, but they can also translate, make remixes, and produce new stories based on your work. All new work based on yours will carry the same license, so any derivatives will also be non-commercial in nature.

Events
In April 2008, Zhura partnered with Improv Asylum, a comedy troupe in Boston, Massachusetts to produce a live sketch comedy show called "You Wrote It, Live" entirely written by the public on Zhura. Another show was produced in June.

See also
Web 2.0
Screenwriting
Creative Commons
List of screenwriting software

References

External links
Scripped - official website
Creative Commons

Collaborative software
Social networking services
Screenwriting software
Web applications
Creative Commons-licensed websites